Act Your Age may refer to:

 "Act Your Age" (House), an episode of the American TV series House
 "Act Your Age" (Phineas and Ferb), an episode of the American TV series Phineas and Ferb
 Act Your Age (radio series), a BBC Radio 4 panel game hosted by Simon Mayo

Music
 Act Your Age (Home Grown album)
 Act Your Age (Gordon Goodwin's Big Phat Band album)
 "Act Your Age" (song), a song by Bliss n Eso
 "Act Yr Age", a 2011 single by Bluejuice, sampled in the Bliss n Ego song.
 "Act Your Age", song by	The Four Esquires	1959